Just like a Woman is a 1967 British comedy film written and directed by Robert Fuest and starring Wendy Craig, Francis Matthews, John Wood, Dennis Price and Clive Dunn. The film's plot follows a wealthy couple who work in the entertainment industry and decide to separate, but soon begin to miss each other.

Cast
 Wendy Craig - Scilla Alexander
 Francis Matthews - Lewis McKenzie
 John Wood - John Martin
 Dennis Price - Bathroom Salesman
 Miriam Karlin - Ellen Newman
 Peter Jones - Saul Alexander
 Clive Dunn - Graf von Fischer
 Ray Barrett - Australian
 Sheila Steafel - Isolde
 Aubrey Woods - T.V. Floor Manager
 Barry Fantoni - Elijah Stark
 Juliet Harmer - Lewis's Girl Friend
 Mark Murphy - Singer
 Michael Brennan - Commissionaire
 Angela Browne - Scilla's Friend

Critical reception
In the Radio Times, David Parkinson wrote, "Craig here reveals the comic flair that enabled her to become the epitome of scatty domesticity in sitcoms like Not in Front of the Children and Butterflies. Fuest's script strives too hard to be offbeat, however, notably in the creation of a goose-stepping interior designer."

References

External links

1967 films
Films directed by Robert Fuest
British comedy films
1967 comedy films
1967 directorial debut films
1960s English-language films
1960s British films